John Candler may refer to:

 John W. Candler (1828–1903),  United States Representative from Massachusetts
 John Candler (abolitionist) (1787–1869), English abolitionist
 John Candler (cricketer) (1873–1942), English cricketer
 John Candler (diver) (born 1939), British Olympic diver
 John S. Candler (1861–1941), American judge and colonel of the Spanish–American War